Wireless telephone may refer to:

 Cordless telephone, a telephone in which the handset is portable and communicates with the body of the phone by radio, instead of being attached by a cord
 Mobile phone, a portable telephone that can make and receive calls over a radio frequency link while the user is moving within a telephone service area
 Photophone, a device invented jointly by Alexander Graham Bell and his assistant Charles Sumner Tainter in 1880

See also 
 Cordless
 Wireless
 Telephone (disambiguation)
 Phone (disambiguation)